Marco Hober (born 9 September 1995) is a German footballer who plays as a midfielder for Regionalliga West side SV Rödinghausen.

Club career
On 23 January 2023, Hober signed a 2.5-year contract with SV Rödinghausen.

References

1995 births
Living people
Sportspeople from Bielefeld
Footballers from North Rhine-Westphalia
German footballers
Association football midfielders
Arminia Bielefeld players
Borussia Dortmund II players
Sportfreunde Lotte players
SV Rödinghausen players
3. Liga players
Regionalliga players